Birlik may refer to:

Unity (Uzbekistan)
Birlik, Kazakhstan
Birlik, Issyk Kul, Kyrgyzstan
Birlik, Lice

See also
, a ferry in service 2007-13